The Belt Commercial Historic District, on Castner St. in Belt, Montana, dates from 1896.  It was listed on the National Register of Historic Places in 2004 as a historic district.  The listing included 13 contributing buildings and two contributing structures.

References

External links

National Register of Historic Places in Cascade County, Montana
Historic districts on the National Register of Historic Places in Montana
Neoclassical architecture in Montana
Buildings and structures completed in 1896